Kaeng Krung National Park is a national park in southern Thailand, protecting 338,125 rai ~  of forests in the Phuket mountain range. It was declared a national park on 4 December 1991.

The park is in northwest Surat Thani Province, covering area of the districts Tha Chana, Chaiya, Tha Chang, and Vibhavadi. The area encompasses two mountain chains, with the highest elevation being Khao Sung at 849 meters. The northern part drains via the Khlong Sa toward the Lang Suan River, while the south drains via the Khlong Yan to the Phum Duang River.

The wildlife in the park includes elephants, bears, gaurs, tapirs, tigers, several monkey species, as well as many bird species.

See also
List of national parks of Thailand
List of Protected Areas Regional Offices of Thailand

References

External links
National Park, Wildlife and Plant Conservation Department

National parks of Thailand
Geography of Surat Thani province
Protected areas established in 1990
Tenasserim Hills
Tourist attractions in Surat Thani province
1991 establishments in Thailand